This is a list of Germany's tallest structures, containing all types of structures. Please correct and expand this list.

Various other wind turbines reach at least 200 m tip height (list will not be updated completely as regards more recent wind turbines, see also German Wikipedia article).

Highest structures by structural type/use

Towers 
 Free-standing tower: Berlin TV Tower, Berlin, 368 m
 Concrete tower: Berlin TV Tower, Berlin, 368 m
 Lattice tower: Suspension pylons of Elbe Crossing 2, Stade, 227 m (before 1972: Königs Wusterhausen Central Tower, Königs Wusterhausen, 243 m )
 Electricity pylon:  Suspension pylons of Elbe Crossing 2, Stade, 227 m
 Wind turbine: Fuhrländer Wind Turbine Laasow, Laasow, 205 m
 Ride: Scream, Heidepark Soltau, 103 m
 Aerial tramway support pillar: Pillar II of Eibsee Aerial Tramway, Garmisch-Partenkirchen: 85 m
 Lighthouse: Campen Lighthouse, Campen: 65 m
 Test Tower: Rottweil Test Tower, near Rottweil: 246 m
 Wooden Tower: Windkraftanlage Hannover-Marienwerder, near Hannover: 100 m (1933-1945: Mühlacker Radio Tower, Mühlacker: 190 m, 1945-1948: Tegel Radio Tower, Berlin: 165 m, 1948-1983: Ismaning Radio Tower, Ismaning: 163 m), 2002-2012: Rottenbuch Radio Tower, Peiting: 66 m)

Chimney 
 Chimney: Chimney of Buschhaus Power Station, Helmstedt: 308 m (1981-2006: Chimney of Westerholt Power Station, Westerholt: 337 m)
 Cooling Tower: Niederaussem Power Station, Niederaussem: 200 m
 Brick chimney: Halsbrücker Esse, Freiberg im Sachsen, 140 m

Buildings 
 Highrise: Commerzbank Tower, Frankfurt/Main: 300 m
 Industrial building: Block K of Niederaussem Power Station, Niederaussem: 168 m
 Church: Ulm Münster, Ulm: 161 m
 Residential: Colonia-Haus, Cologne: 155 m
 Silo: Schapfen Mill Tower Silo, Ulm: 125 m
 Light advertisement: Bayer Cross Leverkusen, Leverkusen: 118 m
 Wooden Building: Jahrtausendturm, Magdeburg: 60 m
 Brick building:St. Martin's Church, Landshut: 130.6 m

Guyed mast 
 Guyed mast (grounded): Longwave transmitter Donebach, Mudau: 363 m
 Guyed mast (insulated): Masts of DHO38, Saterland: 353 m
 Partially guyed tower: Waldenburg TV Tower: 165 m

Bridges and dams 

At all bridges height of highest pillar is given

 Bridge: Kocher Valley Bridge, Geislingen am Kocher: 178 m
 Railway Bridge: Müngsten Bridge, Solingen: 107 m
 Suspension Bridge: Fleher Bridge, Düsseldorf: 146 m
 Brick Bridge: Göltzsch Viaduct, Vogtland: 78 m
 Dam: Rappbode Dam, Hasselfelde: 106 m

List of tallest structures of the different states in Germany

Schleswig-Holstein
 FM- and TV-masts Bungsberg, 231 m

Close to the site, there is a telecommunication tower of reinforced concrete, the Telecommunication Tower Bungsberg with an observation deck in a height of 40 m.

Free and Hanseatic City of Hamburg
 FM- and TV-Mast Hamburg-Billstedt, 300 m

Free Hanseatic City of Bremen 
 Chimney of Unit 6 of Bremen-Hafen Power Station, 250 m

Mecklenburg-Western Pomerania
 FM and TV-mast Schwerin-Zippendorf, 273 m

Close to it, there is the  TV Tower Schwerin-Zippendorf, a TV tower of reinforced concrete with an observation deck.

Berlin
 TV Tower Berlin, 368.03 m

Brandenburg
 New longwave transmission mast Zehlendorf, 359.7 m

Lower Saxony
 VLF transmission masts Saterland, 352.9 m

Saxony-Anhalt
 longwave transmission mast Burg, 324 m

Free State of Saxony
 Chimney of heating power station Chemnitz-Nord, 300 m
 3 chimneys of Kraftwerk Boxberg (Werk 1 und 2), 300 m

Free State of Thuringia
 Chimney of Erfurt-Ost Heating Power Station, 226 m (demolished)
 Chimneys of Gera-Nord Heating Power Station, 225 m
 Chimney of Jena Heating Power Station, 225 m

North Rhine-Westphalia
 Chimney of Power Station Westerholt, 337 m (demolished in 2006)
 FM and TV-mast Wesel, 320.8 m

Hesse
 Europe Tower (Telecommunication Tower Frankfurt), 337.5 m

Rhineland-Palatinate
 FM- and TV Mast Scharteberg, 302 m

Saarland
 FM- and TV Mast Riegelsberg, 287 m

Baden-Württemberg
 Longwave transmission masts Donebach, 363 m
 Rottweil Test Tower, 246 m

Free State of Bavaria
 Telecommunication Tower Nuremberg, 292 m

See also
 List of tallest buildings in Germany

External links
 http://skyscraperpage.com/diagrams/?searchID=37735471

Tallest structures in Germany, List of
Germany